Rahman Jafari (born 6 March 1997) is an Iranian footballer forward who plays for Shams Azar in Azadegan League.

References 

1997 births
Living people
Iranian footballers
Nassaji Mazandaran players
Shahr Khodro F.C. players
Persian Gulf Pro League players
Association football forwards
People from Babol
Sportspeople from Mazandaran province